Firq Air Base/Nizwa Airport  was an airport serving the city of Nizwa in Oman.

Per Google Earth historical imagery, the runway was demolished sometime after 2009.

See also

List of airports in Oman
Transport in Oman

References

External links
 OurAirports - Oman
 Great Circle Mapper - Nizwa

 Google Earth

Airports in Oman